Bagh-e Latifan (also Romanized as Bāgh-e Laţīfān and Bāgh-e Loţfīān; also known simply as Bagh (Persian: باغ), also Romanized as Bāgh) is a village in Pishkuh-e Zalaqi Rural District, Besharat District, Aligudarz County, Lorestan Province, Iran. At the 2006 census, its population was 370, in 65 families.

References 

Towns and villages in Aligudarz County